"Neighbors Know My Name" is a song by American R&B singer Trey Songz. It was written by Songz with Patrick Hayes and Troy Taylor, who produced the song with John "$K" McGee. It was released to rhythmic and urban airplay as the fifth and final single from his third studio album, Ready on February 16, 2010. The song, described as being hook-heavy and having a powerful bassline, received generally positive reviews from critics. The song reached forty-three on the Billboard Hot 100 and four on the Hot R&B/Hip-Hop Songs chart, becoming Songz's third consecutive top five R&B hit.

Composition and critical reception

Melanie Bertoldi of Billboard gave the song a positive review, stating, "he utilizes his vocal range here, including the teasing falsetto with which he gently instructs his partner to 'take this pillow right here/If you bite it, they won't hear.' Bertoldi also complimented the song's production, commenting, "'Neighbors' employs a knocking bassline and drip-drop effect to provide the ideal erotic backdrop for Songz's dirty talk." She also pointed out that the song was inspired by Songz's "stylistic antecedent", R. Kelly. Mark Edward Nero of About.com also said the song was R. Kelly influenced, calling the song among the album's best material. Nero said, "Trey brags about how the people next door probably know who he is because his woman screams it during sex. 'While I be bangin' on your body, they be bangin' on our wall,' he sings. 'While they be dreamin', you be screamin', now they bangin' on our door.'" Ready album reviews from Allmusic and PopMatters, noted the track as a standout, with Tyler Lewis of the latter stating the "good" songs like "Neighbors" and "I Need A Girl" "thump as they should". Ken Capobianco of the Boston Globe complimented the song's braggadocio along with "I Invented Sex", however commented that the song was "unintentionally humorous". Andrew Rennie of Now Magazine said the album's hook-heavy and playful style was evident on the track and on "LOL".

Chart performance
On the week ending March 13, 2010, "Neighbors Know My Name" debuted at eighty-eight on the Billboard Hot 100. A little over a month later, on the week ending May 15, 2010, it peaked at forty-three on the chart. In its twenty-seventh week on the chart, "Neighbors Know My Name" peaked at the top spot on the Hot R&B/Hip-Hop Songs chart, becoming his fourth top ten single from Ready and his third consecutive top five hit.

Music video
The video was directed by Yolande Geralds, also director for the "I Invented Sex and Say Aah videos. Teairra Mari, D. Woods, and Shanell were reported to have cameos, but the scenes were evidently cut. The video premiered on March 1, 2010. On March 3, 2010, the video was "The New Joint of the Day" on BET's 106 & Park. The music video starts off with an intimate milk bath scene with Trey Songz and model-actress, Jessica White along with the song "Panty Droppa", the intro track on Ready, played in the background. It then branches off into "Neighbors Know My Name" playing in the background with the rest of the music video taking place in a bedroom with love scenes of both Songz and White. Some scenes also include Trey Songz in front of a red background.

Live performances
He performed the song  on 106 & Park on February 11, 2010 for "Love Week" with a medley of "Say Aah", and "I Invented Sex".

Credits and personnel
Songwriting - Trey Songz, Troy Taylor, 7illin, Patrick Hayes
Production - 7illin, Troy Taylor,Patrick Hayes
Recording - John McGee
Mixing - Jean Marie Horvat

Charts

Weekly charts

Year-end charts

Certifications

Release history

References

2010 singles
Trey Songz songs
Songs written by Trey Songz
Song recordings produced by Troy Taylor (record producer)
2009 songs
Atlantic Records singles